David Granger may refer to:

David A. Granger (born 1945), President of Guyana
David Granger (bobsleigh) (1903–2002), American, Olympic bobsledder
David Granger (footballer) (born 1955), Australian rules footballer
 David M. Granger, editor-in-chief of Esquire Magazine